Anthonie Leemans (1631 in The Hague – 1673 in Amsterdam), was a Dutch Golden Age painter.

Biography
According to Houbraken, who did not specify which brother he meant, he made a profitable living making trompe l'oeil paintings of hunting paraphernalia, birdcages, and weaponry.

According to the RKD he was the older brother of the painter Johannes Leemans, and both are known for still life paintings of hunting paraphernalia and vanitas pieces that became an influence on Christoffel Pierson for their popularity. Anthonie also painted a few Italianate landscapes with soldiers.

References

Anthonie Leemans on Artnet

1631 births
1673 deaths
Dutch Golden Age painters
Dutch male painters
Artists from The Hague
Dutch still life painters